James Michael Hamper (born June 15, 1955) is an American politician and carpenter from Maine. Hamper is a Republican State Senator from Maine's 19th District, representing parts of Cumberland and Oxford Counties, including his residence of Oxford. Hamper earned a A.A. from the University of Maine at Augusta in 2001. He was first elected to the Maine House of Representatives in 2004 and was unable to run for re-election in 2012 due to term-limits. From 2010 to 2012, Hamper served as the House chairman of the Legislature's Environment and Natural Resources Committee and a member of the Energy, Utilities and Technology Committee. In 2012, he was elected to the Maine Senate, replacing fellow Republican David Hastings.

Hamper is a practicing carpenter in Otisfield, Maine and a member of the Oxford Advent Christian Church, an evangelical church in Oxford.

References

1955 births
Living people
People from Oxford, Maine
Politicians from Dayton, Ohio
University of Maine at Augusta alumni
American carpenters
Republican Party members of the Maine House of Representatives
Republican Party Maine state senators
21st-century American politicians